Gornje Dubovo is a village in the municipality of Višegrad, Bosnia and Herzegovina.

Notable people
 Višnja Mosić (1870-1937), war heroine during WWI

References

Populated places in Višegrad